The Hunger Art is an opera in one act by Jeff Myers, to a libretto by Royce Vavrek after Franz Kafka.  

Written during Myers's residency at American Lyric Theater, the opera was performed in concert at the Leonard Nimoy Thalia Theatre at Peter Norton Symphony Space in Manhattan, New York, on January 7, 2008.

Roles and role creators
Ivona, Amanda Pabyan
Alfons, Thomas Wazelle
Milos, David Korn 
Bronislav, Bryce Smith
Butcher, Edwin Vega

Synopsis

The opera is a narrative hybrid of the Kafka's short story "A Hunger Artist" and a revisionist take on Adam and Eve.

References

2008 operas
English-language operas
One-act operas
Operas
Adaptations of works by Franz Kafka
Operas based on literature